The Lorain County League (LC8) is an Ohio high school athletic league that began with the 2019-20 school year and is made up of eight schools predominantly based in Lorain County, Ohio.  All schools are members of the Ohio High School Athletic Association.  Previous versions of a Lorain County League existed from 1924–61 and again from 1968-2005.

League history
The most recent idea for the new LCL was formed in 2017 when the eight primarily Lorain County schools (Brookside, Clearview, Columbia, Firelands, Keystone, Oberlin, and Wellington, as well as Black River) announced they would leave the Patriot Athletic Conference (PAC) to form their own league by 2020.

In response to the PAC's imminent dissolution, Brooklyn and Lutheran West were accepted by a league-wide vote in April 2018 to join the Chagrin Valley Conference in 2019-20.

In May 2018, Buckeye and Fairview were approved to join the Great Lakes Conference for the 2019-20 school year as their eighth and ninth members.

Since the four schools that weren't invited to join the new LC8 were able to leave the PAC after the 2018-19 school year, the LC8 was able to begin a year sooner than anticipated.

Previous Lorain County League/Conference memberships
The first version of the Lorain County League began in 1924 as one of several small-school county leagues across Ohio.  The league survived the consolidation wave until 1961, when the schools who weren't already aligned with the Inland Conference joined the Lakeland Conference. The conference revived itself in 1986 as the Lorain County Conference when the Lakeland Conference collapsed, and the schools banded together for roughly two decades until the schools split, this time to help form the Patriot Athletic and West Shore conferences.

First Version (Lorain County League, 1924–61)
 Avon Eagles1 (1924–61, to Inland)
 Avon Lake Shoremen (1924–1961, to Lakeland)
 Belden Bees (1924–55, consolidated into Midview)
 Brighton Bears (1924–52, consolidated into Wellington)
 Sheffield Brookside Cardinals1 (1924–61, to Inland)
 Brownhelm Bombers (1924–52, consolidated into Firelands)
 Kipton Camden Knights (1924–52, consolidated into Firelands)
 Columbia Station Columbia Raiders1 (1924–61, to Inland)
 Grafton Eaton Eels (1924–55, consolidated into Midview)
 Grafton Comets (1924–55, consolidated into Midview)
 Henrietta Hawks (1924–52, consolidated into Firelands)
 LaGrange Wildcats (1924–59, consolidated into Keystone)
 North Ridgeville Rangers (1924–27, to NOAL, 1933–61, to Lakeland)
 Penfield Bombers (1924–59, consolidated into Keystone)
 South Amherst Cavaliers1 (1924–61, to Inland)
 Wellington Dukes (1924–27, to NOAL)
 Lorain Clearview Clippers (1928–38, to NOAL, 1947–53, to Lakeland)
 Oberlin Firelands Falcons1 (1952–61, to Inland)
 Grafton Midview Middies (1955–61, to Lakeland)
 Lagrange Keystone Wildcats2 (1959–61)

 Concurrent with Inland Conference 1957-61.
 Concurrent with Inland Conference 1959-61.

Division Alignments

Second Version (Lorain County Conference, 1986-2005)

See also
Ohio high school athletic conferences
Ohio High School Athletic Association

References

External links
Patriot Athletic Conference - Official Site
Fit for a Pirate?

Ohio high school sports conferences